Brook Richard Williams (22 January 1938 – 29 April 2005) was a British stage actor who also made numerous film and television appearances in small roles.

Biography
His father was the Welsh playwright and actor Emlyn Williams. His older brother Alan was a foreign correspondent and novelist.

Brook was born in London and attended Stowe School in Buckinghamshire. After national service in the RAF he appeared on stage in repertory theatre, in London's West End and abroad on tour.

His film appearances included: The Plague of the Zombies (1966), Where Eagles Dare (1968), Anne of the Thousand Days (1969), Villain (1971), The Wild Geese (1978) and The Sea Wolves (1980). He was a close friend, assistant and advisor to actor Richard Burton who had known him since he was a child and he appeared in several films in which Burton starred. He died of lung cancer aged 67.

Partial filmography

 The V.I.P.s (1963) - First Reporter (uncredited)
 First Men in the Moon (1964) - astronaut (uncredited)
 Hot Enough for June (1964) - Leon
 The Heroes of Telemark (1965) - Einar
 The Plague of the Zombies (1966) - Dr. Peter Tompson
 The Jokers (1967) - Capt. Green (uncredited)
 Where Eagles Dare (1968) - Sgt. Harrod
 Anne of the Thousand Days (1969) -  Sir William Brereton
 The Raging Moon (1971) - Hugh Collins
 Raid on Rommel (1971) - Joe Reilly
 Villain (1971) - Kenneth
 Hammersmith Is Out (1972) - Pete Rutter
 Battle of Sutjeska (1973)
 Massacre in Rome (1973) - SS Hauptsturmführer Erich Priebke
 Equus (1977) - Bit part (uncredited)
 The Medusa Touch (1978) - Male Nurse
 The Wild Geese (1978) - Samuels
 Absolution (1978) - Father Clarence
 North Sea Hijack (1980) - Helicopter Pilot
 The Sea Wolves (1980) - Butterworth
 Pascali's Island (1988) - Turkish Officer
 Testimony (1988) - H.G. Wells
 The 5th Monkey (1990) - Dr. Howard
 The Children (1990) - (uncredited)
 England, My England (1995) - Priest
 The Strange Case of Delphina Potocka or The Mystery of Chopin (1999) - Old Scottish Lord (final film role)

References

External links

1938 births
2005 deaths
Welsh male film actors
Welsh male television actors
Welsh male stage actors
People educated at Stowe School
Deaths from lung cancer